Hargraves is a surname. Notable people with the surname include:

Daniel Hargraves (born 1975), Australian rules footballer 
Edward Hargraves (1816–1891), gold prospector in Australia
Fred Hargraves (1884–1960), English footballer
James Hargraves (1690–1741), English Anglican divine who became the Dean of Chichester Cathedral in 1739
Orin Hargraves (born 1953), American lexicographer
Paul E. Hargraves (born 1941), a phycologist using the standard author abbreviation of Hargraves
Peter Hargraves (born 1972), American retired sprinter
Robert B. Hargraves (1928-2003), geologist

See also
Hargraves, Martian crater, named after Robert B. Hargraves
Hargrave (surname)